Central Stadium was a multi-purpose stadium in Volgograd, Russia, that was a home to FC Rotor Volgograd. It was built in 1962 and renovated in 2002. The capacity of the stadium was 32,120. The stadium was closed and demolished in 2014. A new stadium will be built on site in time for the 2018 FIFA World Cup.

Sports venues completed in 1962
Sports venues built in the Soviet Union
Football venues in Russia
FC Rotor Volgograd
Multi-purpose stadiums in Russia
Buildings and structures in Volgograd
1962 establishments in the Soviet Union
Sports venues demolished in 2014
Demolished buildings and structures in Russia